Efren Manalang Reyes  (born August 26, 1954), popularly known by the nicknames "Bata" (English: "Kid") and "The Magician", is a Filipino professional pool player. Reyes is widely considered one of the greatest pool players of all time. A winner of over 100 international titles, Reyes was the first player to win the WPA World Championships in two different pool disciplines. Among his numerous titles, Reyes is a WPA World Nine-ball Champion and WPA World Eight-ball Champion, a U.S. Open 9-Ball Championship winner, a four-time Sands Regency 9-Ball Open winner, and a thirteen-time Derby City Classic winner. Reyes also represented the Philippines at the World Cup of Pool, winning the event with his partner Francisco Bustamante in 2006 and 2009. Reyes defeating American legend Earl Strickland in the The Color of Money challenge match in 1996, in a winner-take-all prize of $100,000.

Reyes is nicknamed "The Magician"—for his ability on the pool table—and "", to distinguish from a fellow pool player by the same name. In addition to pool, Reyes has played international billiards, specifically Balkline, One-cushion and Three-cushion.

Career

Early life
Reyes was born in Pampanga, Philippines, on August 26, 1954. He moved to Manila aged five to live with his uncle who owned a pool hall. He cleaned the hall and would sleep on the tables. Because he was not tall enough to reach the pool table, he played while standing on Coca-Cola cases that he moved around. Reyes started gambling from a young age, he won his first match for money at the age of nine and continued to play money games with locals in the 1960s.

By the 1970s other players were avoiding playing Reyes, due to this Reyes played other games like 3-cushion billiards and Balkline in order to find people who would play him for money. In 1979 the writer John Grissim published the book "Billiards", where he wrote an article about his encounter with Reyes in 1975 where he describes Efren as an "excellent player" and "able to beat America's best players".

Professional career
In 1978, Reyes competed in the Philippines vs. Japan Rotation Competition, where Reyes represented the Philippines alongside Jose Parica, Rodolfo Luat, Jorge Dacer and Manuel Flores, where the Philippines team won two years in a row until the event ended. In 1979, Reyes defeated Japanese champion Takeshi Okumura to win the All Japan Championship in nine-ball, although not winning the all around title that year.

In 1983, Reyes took on Pepito Dacer in the finals of the Philippine Rotation Championship. The finals were played in race-to-39 and the players competed over 11 racks on a weekly basis. On the seventh week of play, Reyes defeated Dacer 39–32. By the mid 1980s, Reyes was considered one the best players in the country and was banned even from playing in some tournaments on account of him "being too good", which lead Reyes to travel to the United States in 1985.

In 1985, at the start of his career in the U.S., he used the alias "Cesar Morales" to hide his identity so he would be allowed to compete unknown. Although shortly after Reyes was discovered, when he won the first tournament he entered in the Houston Red's 9-Ball Open with a field of 108 of the top players in the country. The same year Reyes finished third in the U.S. Open 9-Ball Championship. Reyes began winning a number of tournaments in the United States and in Asia, traveling back and forth between the two, garnering attention and recognition internationally. 

In 1994, Reyes won the U.S. Open 9-Ball Championship by defeating Nick Varner in the finals and became the first non-American to win the event. In 1996, Reyes and Earl Strickland were chosen as the two best players in the world, to compete against each other in a challenge match, named after the recently released film The Color of Money. The event was a three-day race-to-120 challenge match of nine-ball. It was held in Hong Kong, with a winner-take-all prize of $100,000. Reyes won the match 120–117 despite being 17 racks behind, to win the prize. In 1999, Reyes won the first televised World Pool Championship that was hosted by Matchroom Pool. At the time, the tournament was not recognized by the World Pool Association, which ran their own event, although they later acknowledged the event was an official WPA World Championship. This made Reyes the second Filipino player after Jose Parica to win a world championship in pocket billiards. In 2001, Reyes participated in the 2001 Tokyo 9-Ball Open, the event had over 700 players participating. Reyes dominated the event, beating Niels Feijen in the finals 15–7 and earning $163,000 first prize. At the time, this was the biggest first prize in a pool tournament.

He reached the final of the 2004 WPA World Eight-ball Championship, where he met Marlon Manalo in the final. He trailed 0–4, but won eight straight racks and won the final 11–8. The win made Reyes the first player to win WPA world championships in more than one discipline.

Reyes won the 2005 IPT King of the Hill Eight-ball Shootout, winning $200,000, which was the largest first place prize of any pool tournament at the time. In the final, he met Mike Sigel in a best-of-three sets match, winning 8–0 in the first set and 8–5 in the second. The following year, Reyes won the IPT World Open Eight-ball Championship over Rodney Morris 8–6, earning $500,000, which is still the largest first place prize of any pool tournament in history.

He partnered with Francisco Bustamante to represent the Philippines at the inaugural World Cup of Pool. They reached the 2006 final, where they met Earl Strickland and Rodney Morris representing the United States. They won seven consecutive racks to win the final 13–5. He also won the 2009 event once again partnering Bustamante. The pair met the German team of Ralf Souquet and Thorsten Hohmann in the final and won 11–9.

Reyes still actively competes in professional events on occasions, in such events as the Southeast Asian Games, which he won six gold medalsand the Derby City Classic which he is the overall winner on five occasions. In 2023, at the age of 68 years old, Reyes finished third in the Derby City Classic One Pocket, with a field of over 400 players.

Media and persona
Reyes is known for his highly creative play. Reyes is often called by his nickname "", which means "kid" in Filipino, given to him by close friends to distinguish him from an older Efren who also played pool. Reyes's ability to play  shots led to his gaining the nickname "Magician". When Reyes first arrived in the United States, he took the name Cesar Morales as he knew that players had heard his name but not seen what he looked like and he wished to continue hustling.

In 2003, Reyes was featured in the Filipino movie Pakners with actor Fernando Poe Jr., which was Poe's last film before his run for presidency and then death later in 2004. Reyes also appeared in the 2007 short film Nineball. In one episode of the TV series Magpakailanman, the story follows a young Efren "Bata" Reyes (portrayed by Anjo Yllana) in his early pool-playing days as he progresses from a money player to a tournament contender.

Reyes lives in Angeles City, with his wife Susan and their three children. He considers balkline to be his favorite cue sport, and plays chess as a hobby.

Despite admitting that his skill has declined by 2019, games involving him still continue to draw in big crowds in the 2019 and 2021 Southeast Asian Games.

Accolades

Numerous fellow professional players have credited Reyes with being the greatest living player in the world. During ESPN television commentary on a semi-finals match between Reyes and Mika Immonen at the 2000 BCA Open Nine-ball Championship, veteran professional Billy Incardona stated that Reyes was "indisputably the best player in the world—especially when you consider all games—he can play any game as well as anyone, maybe better than anyone ... In my opinion we're watching probably the greatest player in my lifetime and I've been watching pool for the better part of forty years."

In 1995, Billiards Digest magazine named Reyes the Player of the Year. The following year, when Reyes was ranked number one on the United States' Pro Billiards Tour, the June 1996 issue of the magazine featured a poll of "billiard cognoscenti"—pro players, billiards writers, industry insiders and the like—to pick the best in billiards in various categories. Billiards own elite named Reyes the best one-pocket player of all time. The magazine wrote, "While a bevy of one-pocket geniuses abound, Efren Reyes, whose prowess in one-pocket is sometimes obscured by his 9-ball stardom, was the popular pick. Is there anything Bata can't do?"

Reyes became the first Asian to be inducted into the Billiard Congress of America Hall of Fame in 2003. He was also inducted into the One Pocket Hall of Fame in 2004. Reyes was appointed Philippine Sports Ambassador for the 2005 Southeast Asian Games.

Efren has been awarded the Philippine Sportswriters Association Sportsman of the Year on three occasions: in 1999, 2001 and 2006. He was given the Philippine Legion of Honor, and included in Time magazine's 60 Asian heroes in 2006. He was also awarded the Philippine Order of Lakandula "Champion for Life Award" in 2006. 

Efren has been the Money Leader for the year seven times: in 1995, 1999, 2001, 2002, 2004, 2005 and 2006. He also holds the record for highest recorded earnings of any pool player, being the most amount of money won in tournament play in a season, winning $645,000 in 2006.

Titles

Reyes is a winner of over 100 professional tournaments, including: 

 WPA World Eight-ball Championship (2004)
 WPA World Nine-ball Championship (1999)
 U.S. Open 9-Ball Championships (1994)
 U.S. Open One-Pocket Championship (2000, 2011)
 PBT Riviera Eight-ball Championship (1995, 1996)
 PBT Riviera Team Championship (1993)
 Sands Regency 9-Ball Open (1985, 1986, 1995, 1999)
 Masters 9-Ball Championship (1988, 2001)
 Derby City Classic 
 One-Pocket (1999, 2004, 2005, 2006, 2007, 2014) 
 Master of the Table (1999, 2004, 2005, 2007, 2010)
 Nine-ball (2005, 2010)
 ESPN Challenge
 Ultimate Nine-Ball Challenge (1999)
 Ultimate Shootout (1999)
 Tokyo Open 9-Ball (1992, 2001)
 All Japan Championship (1979, 1990, 1999, 2003)
 International Pool Tour
 IPT King of the Hill Eight-Ball Shootout (2005)
 IPT World Open Eight-ball Championship (2006)
 International Challenge of Champions (2002)
 World Cup of Pool (2006, 2009) - with (Francisco Bustamante)
 World Pool League (2001, 2002)

See also

References

External links

 Efren Reyes Net Worth by Billiard Guides

1954 births
Recipients of the Order of Lakandula
Filipino male film actors
Filipino pool players
Living people
Sportspeople from Angeles City
Kapampangan people
World champions in pool
Asian Games medalists in cue sports
Cue sports players at the 2010 Asian Games
Cue sports players at the 2002 Asian Games
Asian Games bronze medalists for the Philippines
Medalists at the 2002 Asian Games
Southeast Asian Games bronze medalists for the Philippines
Southeast Asian Games medalists in cue sports
WPA World Eight-ball Champions
WPA World Nine-ball Champions
Recipients of the Philippine Legion of Honor
Competitors at the 2011 Southeast Asian Games
Competitors at the 2013 Southeast Asian Games
Competitors at the 2015 Southeast Asian Games
Competitors at the 2017 Southeast Asian Games
Competitors at the 2019 Southeast Asian Games
Competitors at the 2021 Southeast Asian Games
Competitors at the 1987 Southeast Asian Games